Passiflora × violacea, the violet passion flower, is a hybrid between two species of flowering plants, Passiflora racemosa × Passiflora caerulea, in the family Passifloraceae. The name Passiflora × violacea has yet to be resolved as a correct scientific name; nevertheless it is widely found in the horticultural literature.

While somewhat hardier than one of its parents, P. racemosa, it is considerably less hardy than the other, P. caerulea (which can be grown outside in warm or coastal areas).

Passiflora × violacea may well be the very first Passiflora to have been hybridised, by the British nurseryman Thomas Milne, in 1819. It was subsequently described by Joseph Sabine of the Royal Horticultural Society, then in 1824 by the French botanist Jean-Louis-Auguste Loiseleur-Deslongchamps in the "Herbier General de l'Amateur,", giving it its current name.

This hybrid has in its turn given rise to several cultivars, notably ‘Victoria’. It has won the Royal Horticultural Society’s Award of Garden Merit.

References

violacea
Hybrid plants
Plants described in 1824